Commercial Building at 500 North Tryon Street is a historic commercial building located at Charlotte, Mecklenburg County, North Carolina. It was designed by architect Louis H. Asbury and built in 1921.  It is a two-story with full basement, rectangular building with load-bearing brick walls. It measures approximately 46 feet in width and 146 feet in depth.  The building originally housed an automobile dealership.

It was added to the National Register of Historic Places in 1992.

References

Commercial buildings on the National Register of Historic Places in North Carolina
Commercial buildings completed in 1921
Buildings and structures in Charlotte, North Carolina
National Register of Historic Places in Mecklenburg County, North Carolina